Abraham Lichtstein was a Polish rabbi and Talmudist. He served as the Av Beis Din of Przasnysz, Poland and authored a commentary on the Pentateuch entitled Kanfei Nesharim ("Wings of Eagles").

Lichtstein was born in Białystok at the end of the eighteenth century. He was the son of Rabbi Eliezer Lipman Lichtstein and grandson of Rabbi Kalman of Białystok.
 
His major work, Kanfei Nesharim, was published in Warsaw in 1881. The sefer is divided into several parts, each with a separate name:
Kiryat Sefer, an introduction to each book of the Pentateuch
To'aliyyot ha-Ralbag, a treatment of the doctrines deduced by Gersonides from passages of the Torah
Abach Soferim, miscellanea
Machazeh Abraham, consisting of sermons on each section of the Torah
Ner Mitzvah, a treatment of the number of the precepts according to Maimonides
Shiyyure Miẓwah, a treatment of the additional precepts according to Nahmanides, Moses ben Jacob of Coucy, and Isaac ben Joseph of Corbeil
Milchemet Mitzvah, on the disputes among various authorities concerning the numbering of the precepts by Maimonides
Torat ha-Ḳorbanot, on the Levitical laws of offerings and on the order of the High Priest's service in the Sanctuary on Yom Kippur
Sha'arei Tziyyon, orations on theological subjects

The whole work was published together with the text of the Pentateuch (Josefow, 1829) and republished without the text (Vilna, 1894).

Lichtstein also authored a commentary on the Sefer ha-Tappuach, which was published together with the text in the Grodno edition of 1799.

References

External links
Sefer Kanfei Nesharim (Hebrew download)
 Jewish Encyclopedia: “Lichtstein, Abraham B. Eliezer Lipman” by Solomon Schechter & N. T. London (1906). Now in public domain.

19th-century deaths
Bible commentators
People from Białystok
18th-century births
19th-century Polish rabbis